Señora Acero is an American-Mexican television series developed by Argos Comunicación and Telemundo Studios, based on an original idea of Roberto Stopello. As of the third season, the series was renamed to Señora Acero: La Coyote. The series premiered on September 23, 2014 in the United States on Telemundo television network, and concluded on January 29, 2019.

Set and filmed in Mexico and United States, Seasons 1 and 2 tell the story of Sara Aguilar, a beautiful housewife, who by obligation ends up becoming the most powerful drug and money laundering trafficker in Mexico to protect her son and her friends. Season 3 until series finale focuses on the life of Vicenta Acero, better known as La Coyote, who helps immigrants cross the Mexican border to fulfill the American dream of thousands of Mexicans fleeing their country of origin because of drug traffickers and corrupt politicians.

Character appearances

References 

Señora Acero
Lists of television characters by series